Louise Sandhaus (born 1955) is an American graphic designer and design educator. She is a professor at California Institute of the Arts and is principal of Louise Sandhaus Design.

Early life and education 
Louise Sandhouse was born in 1955 outside of Boston, Massachusetts to Norman, an art director, and Harriet Sandhaus, a newspaper columnist. The family later relocated to Orlando, Florida.

Sandhaus received an associate degree in advertising design from The Art Institute of Fort Lauderdale in 1976. Under Muriel Cooper, the first design director, she worked for MIT Press in Boston in the 1980s. She earned her BFA and MFA in graphic design from the California Institute of the Arts (CalArts) in 1993 and 1994. She received a Graduate Laureate from the Jan Van Eyck Academie in The Netherlands in 1996.

Career 
Sandhaus founded her design studio, Louise Sandhaus Design (LSD), in 1998. She was the co-director of the CalArts Graphic Design Program from 1998 to 2004 and was the program's sole director from 2004 to 2006.

Since 1999, Sandhaus has collaborated with architecture firm Durfee Regn as Durfee Regn Sandhaus. The collective has designed museum exhibitions and interdisciplinary projects. Her work is included in the San Francisco Museum of Modern Art's permanent collection and the Bibliothèque nationale de France in Paris. She co-curated the Graphic Design section of the 2010 California Design Biennial Action/Reaction.

Sandhaus received the AIGA Los Angeles Fellow Award in 2009 and served on the organization's national board from 2009 to 2011. She is currently working with AIGA on Making History, a national initiative to build and preserve graphic design history through crowd-sourcing and utilizing a digital platform/tool.

Sandhaus's book on West Coast design history, Earthquakes, Mudslides, Fires and Riots: California and Graphic Design 1936-1986 was inspired by English architectural historian Reyner Banham. The book received exceptional press coverage including reviews from The New York Times, The Guardian (London), The Los Angeles Review of Books, and Eye magazine. An exhibition including page spreads of the proposed book was held at Los Angeles Municipal Art Gallery in 2008.

In 2022, she was awarded the AIGA Medal for her work as an educator and author.

Selected publications

References

Further reading
 Gerda Breuer and Julia Meer: Women in Graphic Design, Jovis/Berlin 2012, p. 541.

External links
Louise Sandhaus Design (LSD)

1955 births
Living people
American graphic designers
Women graphic designers
California Institute of the Arts alumni
California Institute of the Arts faculty
People from Ojai, California